The 2009 Commonwealth of Independent States Cup was the seventeenth edition of the competition between the champions of former republics of Soviet Union. It was won by Sheriff Tiraspol for the second time.

Participants

 1 Rubin Kazan were represented by reserve players with addition of a few main team players.
 2 Shakhtar Donetsk were represented by a reserve team Shakhtar-3 Donetsk.
 3 MTZ-RIPO Minsk replaced BATE Borisov (2008 Belarusian champions), who declined to participate.
 4 Ararat Yerevan replaced Pyunik Yerevan (2008 Armenian champions), who declined to participate in the aftermath of 2006 semifinal incident.
 5 Pakhtakor Tashkent replaced Bunyodkor Tashkent (2008 Uzbekistan champions), who declined to participate.
 6 Inter Turku invited by the organizing committee to replace  Dinamo Tbilisi (2007–08 Georgian champions), who declined to participate along with other Georgian teams due to 2008 South Ossetian War.

Group stage

Group A

Results

Group B
Unofficial table

Official table

Results

Group C

Results

Group D

Results

Final rounds

Bracket

Quarter-finals

Semi-finals

Final

Top scorers

References

External links 
 Russian Football Union Official web-site 
 Commonwealth of Independent States Cup 2009 at rsssf
 2009 CIS Cup at football.by
 2009 CIS Cup at kick-off.by

2009
2009 in Russian football
2008–09 in Ukrainian football
2008–09 in European football
January 2009 sports events in Russia
2009 in Moscow